Leonard Wells Boyd-Gerny (21 May 1916 – 30 October 2011) was an  Australian rules footballer who played with St Kilda in the Victorian Football League (VFL).

Notes

External links 

1916 births
2011 deaths
Australian rules footballers from Victoria (Australia)
St Kilda Football Club players
People educated at Melbourne High School
Melbourne High School Old Boys Football Club players
Australian Army personnel of World War II
Australian Army officers